Gregory Regis Ginn (born June 8, 1954) is an American guitarist, bassist, singer and songwriter, best known for being the leader, primary songwriter, and the only continuous member of the hardcore punk band Black Flag, which he founded and led from 1976 to 1986, and again in 2003. The band announced another reunion in 2013.  Since the breakup of Black Flag, Ginn has recorded solo albums, and performed with such bands as October Faction, Gone, Confront James, Mojack, and others. He was 99th on Rolling Stones list of "The 100 Greatest Guitarists of All Time".

Personal life
Ginn was born June 8, 1954, in Tucson, Arizona.  He began an electronics company in Hermosa Beach, California, called Solid State Tuners, when he was 12 years old and an amateur radio operator.  Ginn became a vegetarian at 17 years old in 1971 and has been a vegan since 1998.  Ginn is the older brother of artist Raymond Ginn, who goes by the pseudonym of Raymond Pettibon.

Ginn owns the Texas-based independent record label SST Records (SST), an outgrowth of his original Solid State Tuners company.

On October 10, 2014, Ginn's ex-wife Marina filed a motion in court to prevent Ginn from having access to their children, claiming Ginn was "routinely denying them food and threatening them," "abusing alcohol and drugs in front of them," had "forced [the children] to do cleaning chores until 2 a.m." "locked [them] in a room alone with no contact with the outside world through cell phone or emails," and had "throw[n] cups of water in their face." She also claimed he had told his daughters "you're hot" and "whistled at them," and told them "they are getting fat and need to lose weight and that their diets will have to be more strenuous." Ex-Black Flag member Ron Reyes later submitted an affidavit to the court supporting Marina Ginn's statements.

Black Flag

Black Flag is an American hardcore punk band formed in 1976 in Hermosa Beach, California. The band was established by Ginn, the guitarist, primary songwriter, and sole continuous member through multiple personnel changes in the band.  They are widely considered to be one of the first hardcore punk bands.  After breaking up in 1986, Black Flag briefly reunited in 2003 and again in 2013.  Black Flag's sound mixed the raw simplicity of the Ramones with atonal guitar solos and frequent tempo shifts.  The lyrics were written mostly by Ginn, and like other punk rock bands of the late 1970s and early 1980s, Black Flag voiced an anti-authoritarian and non-conformist message, in songs punctuated with descriptions of social isolation, neurosis, poverty, and paranoia.  These themes were explored further when Henry Rollins joined the band as lead singer in 1981.  Most of the band's material was released on Ginn's SST Records.

Use of pseudonym

"Dale Nixon" is a pseudonym and multiple-use name originally used by Ginn to obfuscate the fact that he played bass on the later Black Flag albums, My War and What The...  It has since been used by other artists (typically punk) to appear on albums without being in breach of record label contracts that stipulate label exclusivity.  Other artists using the "Dale Nixon" moniker include Dave Grohl, who filled in on drums for the Melvins' 1992 album King Buzzo, and Brian Baker, a founding member of Minor Threat, credited as Nixon on the 1992 Dag Nasty album Four on the Floor.  The name appears once again, listed as a bass player, on the Ryan Adams album Orion; it is likely Ryan himself.

Legacy and praise
Many artists have cited Ginn as an influence or have expressed their admiration for him, including Buzz Osborne of Melvins, Omar Rodríguez-López of The Mars Volta, William DuVall of Alice in Chains, Ben Weinman of The Dillinger Escape Plan, Kurt Ballou of Converge, Justin Sane of Anti-Flag, RM Hubbert, Bill Kelliher of Mastodon, Zach Blair of Rise Against, Weasel Walter, Andrew Williams of Every Time I Die, Laurent Barnard of Gallows, and Nick Reinhart of Tera Melos.

Equipment

Guitars
Ginn's earliest guitar was a Dan Armstrong electric guitar. He eventually started using an Ibanez Roadstar and Fender Stratocaster guitars in later albums.

Amplification
He would play both guitars through an Ampeg SVT-410HLF bass cabinet.

Effects
Ginn never uses any effects or distortion pedals, as depicted in the Nervous Breakdown EP.

Partial discography

Solo
Getting Even LP (Cruz Records, 1993)
Dick LP (Cruz Records, 1993)
Payday EP (Cruz Records, 1993)
Don't Tell Me EP (Cruz Records, 1994)
Let It Burn (Because I Don't Live There Anymore) LP (Cruz Records, 1994)
Bent Edge LP (SST Records, 2007) – with The Taylor Texas Corrugators
Goof Off Experts LP (SST Records, 2008) – with The Taylor Texas Corrugators
Freddie 7" (Electric Cowbell, 2010) – with The Taylor Texas Corrugators
Legends of Williamson County LP (SST Records, 2010) – with The Taylor Texas Corrugators
We Are Amused LP (SST Records, 2011) – with The Royal We
We Are One 12" (SST Records, 2011) – with The Royal We
Fearless Leaders LP (SST Records, 2013) – with The Royal We

Black Flag
Nervous Breakdown EP (SST Records, 1979)
Jealous Again EP (SST Records, 1980)
Six Pack EP (SST Records, 1981)
Louie, Louie single (Posh Boy Records, 1981)
Damaged LP (SST Records/Unicorn Records, 1981)
TV Party single (SST Records/Unicorn Records, 1982)
Everything Went Black double LP (SST Records, 1983)
The First Four Years compilation LP (SST Records, 1983)
My War LP (SST Records, 1983)
Family Man LP (SST Records, 1984)
Slip It In LP (SST Records, 1984)
Live '84 live cassette (SST Records, 1984)
Loose Nut LP (SST Records, 1985)
The Process of Weeding Out EP (SST Records, 1985)
In My Head LP (SST Records, 1985)
Who's Got the 10½? live LP (SST Records, 1986)
Annihilate This Week live EP (SST Records, 1987)
I Can See You EP (SST Records, 1989)
What The... LP (SST Records, 2013)

Minutemen
Paranoid Time EP (SST Records, 1980) (Producer)

SWA
Your Future (If You Have One) LP (SST Records, 1985) (Producer)

October Faction
October Faction live LP (SST Records, 1985)
Second Factionalization LP (SST Records, 1986)

Tom Troccoli's Dog
Tom Troccoli's Dog LP (SST Records, 1985)

Gone
Let's Get Real, Real Gone for a Change LP (SST Records, 1986)
Gone II – But Never Too Gone! LP (SST Records, 1986)
Criminal Mind LP (SST Records, 1994)
Smoking Gun remix EP (SST Records, 1994)
All the Dirt That's Fit to Print LP (SST Records, 1994)
Damage Control remix EP (SST Records, 1995)
Best Left Unsaid LP (SST Records, 1996)
Country Dumb LP (SST Records, 1998)
The Epic Trilogy double CD (SST Records, 2007)

Minuteflag
Minuteflag EP (SST Records, 1986)

Lawndale
Sasquatch Rock LP (SST Records, 1987) (guest)

Rig
Belly to the Ground LP (Cruz Records, 1994) (Producer, guest)

Mojack
Merchandizing Murder CD (SST Records, 1995)
Home Brew CD (SST Records, 1997)
Rub-A-Dub CD (SST Records, 2003, unreleased)
Under The Willow Tree CD (SST Records, 2007)
The Metal Years CD (SST Records, 2008)
Hijinks CD (SST Records, 2011)
Car CD (SST Records, 2013)

Hor
House CD (SST Records, 1995)
Slo N' Sleazy CD (SST Records, 1996)
A Faster, More Aggressive Hor CD (SST Records, 1998)
Bash CD (SST Records, 2003, unreleased)
Culture Wars CD (SST Records, 2010)

Confront James
Test One Reality CD (SST Records, 1995)
Just Do It CD (SST Records, 1995)
Ill Gotten Hatred CD (SST Records, 1996)
Chemical Exposure CD (SST Records, 1996)
Black Mountain Bomb CD (SST Records, 1997)
We Are Humored CD (SST Records, 2003, unreleased)

El Bad
Bad Motherfucker CD (SST Records, 1996)
Trick or Treat CD (SST Records, 1997)

Hotel X
Uncommon Ground CD (SST Records, 1996) (guest)

Bias
Model Citizen CD (SST Records, 1997)

Get Me High
Taming the Underground CD (SST Records, 1997)

Killer Tweeker Bees
Tweaker Blues CD (SST Records, 1997)

Fastgato
Feral CD (SST Records, 2003, unreleased)

Limey LBC
Life of Lime CD (SST Records, 2003, unreleased)

The Perfect Rat
Endangered Languages CD (Alone Records, 2007)

Jambang
Connecting CD (SST Records, 2008)
200 Days in Space DVD (SST Records, 2010)

Ten East
Robot's Guide to Freedom CD (Lexicon Devil, 2008)

Libyan Hit Squad/Round Eye
"Full Circle" EP (Ripping Records, 2010) (Guest)

Good for You
Life Is Too Short Not to Hold a Grudge LP (SST Records, 2013)
Too! LP (SST Records, 2013)
Fucked Up "7"(SST Records, 2013)
Full Serving (SST Records, 2013)

References

External links
Greg Ginn's Official website
SST/Cruz Records

1954 births
American male singers
American people of Estonian descent
American punk rock guitarists
Hardcore punk musicians
Black Flag (band) members
Lead guitarists
Living people
People from Tucson, Arizona
SST Records artists
American male guitarists
20th-century American guitarists
Amateur radio people